Prince Dmitry Petrovich Golitsyn (1860–1928) was a Russian writer, politician and public figure.

He was the leader of the Russian Assembly, a right-wing political group opposed to westernisation, and advocated 'Autocracy, Orthodoxy and Nationality'.

References

Bibliography
 

Russian Empire
1860 births
1928 deaths